Jason Ball (born March 21, 1979) is a former professional American football center for three seasons for the San Diego Chargers.

1979 births
Living people
Sportspeople from Fayetteville, North Carolina
Players of American football from North Carolina
American football centers
New Hampshire Wildcats football players
San Diego Chargers players